Ilona is a Hungarian female given name, the traditional name of the Queen of the Dragon Wolves in Magyar folklore.

Its etymology is uncertain. A common theory is that Ilona is cognate with the Greek given name Helen.

Diminutive forms include Ilonka and Ilike.

Ilona is a common name in Finland, where it is considered to refer to the Finnish word ilo ("joy") and ilona literally means "as a joy [to someone]". It is also common in Latvia, Estonia, France, Lithuania and Poland (formerly in crown union with Hungary).

People
Archduchess Ilona of Austria (1927-2011)
Ilona Andrews, joint pen name of American novelist duo Ilona and Andrew Gordon
Ilona Csáková (born 1970), Czech pop singer
Ilona Eibenschütz (1872–1967), Hungarian pianist
Ilona Elek (1907–1988), Hungarian world and Olympic champion saber fencer
Ilona Fehér (1901–1988), Hungarian violinist and teacher
Ilona Gófitz, Hungarian conjoined twin
Ilona Graenitz (1943–2022), Austrian MP and MEP
Ilona Gusenbauer (born 1947), Austrian high jumper
Ilona Hlaváčková (born 1977), Czech swimmer
Ilona Jokinen (born 1981), Finnish opera singer,
Ilona Maher (born 1996), American rugby player, 2020 Olympian with the USA Eagles Women's Rugby 7s squad,
Ilona Massey (1910–1974), Hungarian actress
Ilona Mitrecey (born 1993), French singer
Ilona Novák (born 1925), Hungarian swimmer
Ilona Ostrowska, Polish actress
Ilona Palásti (1924–1991), Hungarian mathematician
Ilona Senderek (born 1988), Polish figure skater
Ilona Slupianek (born 1956), retired world champion shot putter who competed for East Germany
Ilona Staller (born 1951), aka Cicciolina, Hungarian-born Italian porn-star, sometime politician, and singer
Ilona Štěpánová-Kurzová (1899–1975), Czech concert pianist and piano teacher
Ilona Szabó de Carvalho (born 1978), Brazilian political scientist
Ilona Szilágyi (before 1455–1497), Hungarian princess consort of Wallachia as the second wife of Vlad III the Impaler
Ilona Tőzsér, Hungarian sprint canoer
Ilona Verley, Canadian drag queen
Ilona Zrínyi (1643–1703), Hungarian-Croatian countess

See also
 Ilonka (disambiguation)
 Elonka (disambiguation)

References

Hungarian feminine given names
Feminine given names
Croatian feminine given names
Czech feminine given names
Estonian feminine given names
Finnish feminine given names
German feminine given names
Spanish feminine given names
Polish feminine given names